The Beulé Gate is a fortified gate, constructed in the Roman period, leading to the Propylaia of the Acropolis of Athens. It was constructed almost entirely from spolia taken from the Choragic Monument of Nikias, a monument built in the fourth century BCE and demolished between the second and fourth centuries CE. The dedicatory inscription from Nicias' monument is still visible in the entablature of the Beulé Gate.

The gate was integrated into the Post-Herulian Wall, a late Roman fortification which reinforced the Acropolis as a military stronghold in the years following the city's sack by the Germanic Heruli people in 267. Its construction marked the beginning of a new phase in the Acropolis' use, in which it came to be seen more as a potential defensive position than in the religious terms that had marked its use in the Classical period. During the medieval period, the gate was further fortified and closed off, before being built over with a bastion in Ottoman times.

The monument was discovered by the French archaeologist Charles Ernest Beulé in 1852, and excavated between 1852 and 1853. Its discovery was greeted enthusiastically in France among the scholarly community and the press, though archaeologists and Greek commentators criticised the aggressive means by which Beulé had carried out the excavation. In modern times, the gate has served primarily as an exit for tourists from the Acropolis.

Description 
These towers are in turn joined by walls to the terraces above, including that of the Temple of Athena Nike. The gateway itself is set into a marble wall and aligned with the main route through the Propylaia.

The area above the central doorway is decorated in the Doric order, and consists of an architrave in Pentelic marble, topped with metopes made from tufa and marble triglyphs. Above the metopes and triglyphs is a cornice with mutules, itself topped with an attic.

Date 

The gate's discoverer, Charles Ernest Beulé, erroneously believed the gate to have been the original entrance to the Acropolis. Later research, beginning with that of Paul Graindor in 1914, established it as belonging to the late Roman period, but scholarly opinion remains divided as to the precise date of its construction.

The Beulé Gate is constructed, almost in its entirety, from marble spolia originating in the Choragic Monument of Nikias, a structure build to commemorate the Athenian choregos Nikias. Nikias constructed the monument, shortly after 320 BCE, in honour of his victory in the choregic competitions of that year. It was demolished at an uncertain date: the German archaeologist Wilhelm Dörpfeld suggested 161 CE, on the grounds of his belief that a foundation found underneath the Odeon of Herodes Atticus, constructed in that year, had originally belonged to the monument. The American architectural historian William Bell Dinsmoor alternatively suggested that the demolition may have dated to the late 3rd or early 4th centuries CE.

An inscription found on a stone later reused in the Ottoman fortifications of the Acropolis preserves an inscription commemorating Flavius Septimius Marcellinus for having constructed "the gateway to the Acropolis, from his own resources." It also identifies him as a former , an official who had presided over one of the great Panhellenic games. The inscription has been dated to the mid-4th century CE, after 325; it is generally, though not universally, assumed to be associated with the construction of the Beulé Gate. Other proposed dates for the gate include the reign of the Roman emperor Valerian ( CE) and the period around the sacking of Athens by the Heruli in 267 or 268 CE, either slightly before the sack or around ten years afterwards.

The Beulé Gate shows architectural similarities, such as the use of alternating courses of differently coloured marble, with the Post-Herulian Wall, built around the Acropolis around two decades after the sack of 267 or 268. Sarah A. Rous has therefore suggested that the demolition of the Choragic Monument of Nicias, the construction of the Post-Herulian Wall and the building of the Beulé Gate were approximately contemporary. Judith Binder has suggested that the gate may have been constructed by Dexippus, the Athenian general who successfully defended the Acropolis against the Heruli during their invasion.

Inscription 
The inscription visible on the entabulature was originally the dedicatory inscription of the Choregic Monument of Nicias. It reads as follows:
The inscription would originally have been placed across the architrave of Nicias' monument, and represents one of the latest such inscriptions from Hellenistic Athens. Under Demetrios of Phaleron, who governed Athens between 317 and 307 BCE, sumptuary laws to control aristocrats' ostentatious spending meant that no further choregic monuments were constructed.

Construction 
The American archaeologist and philologist Walter Miller suggested in 1893 that the gate may have been built to replace an older, now-lost gateway, which he hypothesised would have been less strongly fortified. According to Tasos Tanoulas, part of the strategic rationale behind the gate's construction was to safeguard the approach leading to the klepsydra, a spring on the Acropolis which provided it with a safe supply of water in case of siege.During the demolition of the Choragic Monument of Nikias, the structure's geisa were numbered while still in situ, allowing them to be correctly reassembled within the gate. The Doric frieze of the Choragic Monument, built from limestone and marble, was reconstructed along the top of the Beulé Gate, though the architrave of the Choregic Monument, which originally formed a single horizontal beam, was divided into two parts, one above and one below the frieze. Jeffrey M. Hurwitt has described the re-use of the Choragic Monument as a "twice-told Classicism", since the original monument was itself modelled on the Propylaia, and so its re-use created architectural harmony between the Beulé Gate and the Proplyaia to which it led.

Hurwitt has called the construction of the gate a "turning point" in the Acropolis' history, suggesting that it represented a renewed emphasis on the Acropolis' role as a strategic fortification rather than as a religious sanctuary — making the site now "a fortress with temples". Later in the Roman period, an arch was constructed out from the eastern tower of the gate. 

After the Fourth Crusade of 1204, Athens became the centre of the Duchy of Athens. Between the 13th and 15th centuries, the city's Frankish rulers gradually refortified the Acropolis, closing off both the Beulé Gate and the Propylaia, which was further reinforced with the Frankish Tower at an uncertain date. The gates' previous role as an entrance to the Acropolis was taken over by the gate situated beneath the Temple of Athena Nike. At some point in the Ottoman period, a bastion was constructed on top of the gate. By the 19th century, knowledge of the gate's existence was lost.

Excavation 
The gate is named for Charles Ernest Beulé, a French archaeologist and member of the French School at Athens. Beulé had joined the French School in 1849, and discovered the monument while excavating the approach to the Proplyaia in 1852, under the direction of Kyriakos Pittakis, the Greek Ephor General of Antiquities. The excavation has been called "the first of the great archaeological transformations" carried out on the Acropolis.

The existence of a lower route to the Propylaia had become clear during the operations to clear and repair the monuments of the Acropolis following the end of the Greek War of Independence in 1829. In 1846, the French architect and archaeologist  had begun to reveal the staircase leading up to it from the Beulé Gate, but archaeologists did not generally consider that there had been a second gateway. Titeux died in 1846 with his work on the staircase unfinished: in 1850, Pittakis completed the work of clearing it and partially reconstructing the steps.

Pittakis enlisted Beulé to assist with the removal of medieval and modern structures from the remaining parts of the Propylaea in 1852. Beulé, against the prevailing scholarly opinion of his time, believed that Mnesikles, the architect of the Propylaia, had originally constructed a second gateway, and secured Pittakis' blessing as well as support from Alexandre de Forth-Rouen, the French ambassador to Greece, to investigate his hypothesis. On 4 May, the excavators discovered additional steps leading towards the gate, and by 17 May it had become clear that they had found the edge of a fortified wall around the Acropolis, and within it a gateway. The site was visited by King Otto and Queen Amalia of Greece, and the discovery made Beulé's scholarly reputation.

Beulé left Athens for France at the beginning of June, returning in December to direct renewed excavations, now focused on the gate. On 24 December, work was temporarily halted when the Greek Minister for War ordered the excavators to leave, concerned that the excavation would destroy the Acropolis' defensive value in case of a future invasion; Beulé, with the support of the French embassy, was able to persuade the Greek authorities that the Acropolis had little military value anyway, and "would not hold out for twenty-four hours against an assault". 

When work was able to resume in 1853, the excavators encountered a particularly stubborn block of mortar through which their tools could not penetrate. Contemporary archaeologists criticised his actions, as did the Greek newspapers, one of which had previously accused Beulé of wanting to blow up everything on the Acropolis. Pittakis, who had been watching the operation, was almost struck by a fragment of the debris which pierced his hat: reports circulated in the aftermath that he had been killed.

By 31 March, the two towers had been fully revealed, followed by the gateway itself on 1 April. Beulé fixed a commemorative stone to the gate, inscribed in Ancient Greek and reading:

The discovery of the gate prompted scholarly celebration in France, and was reported with enthusiasm in the French press. Jean Baelan has written that it turned Beulé into "the standard-bearer for national honour in the field of archaeology." In recognition of Beulé's discovery, the Académie Française made the Acropolis of Athens the topic for its Grand Prize for Poetry in 1853, which was won by Louise Colet.

After its excavation, the Beulé Gate resumed its original function as a monumental gateway for the Acropolis. In the 1960s, the main entrance was moved to the south-east side, leaving the Beulé Gate as primarily an exit.

Gallery

Footnotes

Explanatory notes

References

Further reading

Bibliography

 
 
 
 
 
 
 
 
 
 
 
  
 
 
 
 
 
 
 
 
 
 
 
 

Acropolis of Athens
1852 archaeological discoveries
Gates in Greece